The Wangaaypuwan, also known as the  Wangaibon or Ngiyampaa Wangaaypuwan, are an Aboriginal Australian people who traditionally lived between Nyngan, the headwaters of Bogan Creek, and on Tigers Camp and Boggy Cowal creeks and west to Ivanhoe, New South Wales. They are a clan of the Ngiyampaa nation.

Ethnonym
The tribal ethnonym derives from their word for "no", variously transcribed worjai, wonghi or wangaay.

Language

They spoke a distinct dialect of the Ngiyambaa language. The last known speaker was a woman called "Old Nanny", from whom a list of sixty words was collected. She died sometime around 1914.

Like other Ngiyampaa people such as the Weilwan, they also referred to themselves according to their home country.

Country
Their area encompassed Trida, Narromine, Nyngan, Girilambone, Cobar, and Gilgunnia. The western boundary lay around Ivanhoe and near the Neckarboo Range. Their southern borders ran to Trundle. When severe drought struck they were known to venture into Wiradjuri land, to their west, on the Lachlan River and Little Billabong Creek.

Social organisation
According to an early observer, A. L. P. Cameron, the Wangaaypuwans' social divisions were as follows:

The Wangaaypuwan intermarried with the Wiradjuri, and the marriage pattern, again according to Cameron, was as follows:

Cameron elsewhere states that Ipatha, Butha, Matha and Kubbitha were the female equivalents of Ipai, Kumbu, Murri and Kubbi.

There were five grades classified for the ages of man: a boy was eramurrung, bimbadjeri during the initiatory months, then bigumjeri. On reaching middle age, he became gibera and in old age giribung.

Lore
According to a Wangaaypuwan story, the emu once had enormous wings, and, flying high, grew curious at the sight of numerous birds engaged in fishing in a lake. On its descent, the other species flew off in alarm, save for the brolga or native companion. The emu inquired about how it might learn the craft of fishing, and the brolga, with treacherous mischief in mind, told it that to trawl up fish, it would have to have its immense wings removed which, on the emu consenting, the native companion set about doing, and, once the shearing was completed, scorned the emu, which was now deprived of flight. On meeting up again after many years, it turned out the emu had a brood of ten chicks, while the brolga had only one. The brolga apologized for her bad behaviour and was forgiven. But, unable to change her malicious ways, she jumped at the excuse provided by the emu's admission it was hard to feed her nurslings, by suggesting they eat them.

Once more the emu was inveigled into accepting the brolga's advice, only, once the latter had gorged itself, to be cajoled for its stupidity in having its young killed. On a third occasion, the brolga, seeing the emu on a brood of 10 eggs, tried to get them, but was fended off as the emu rushed off the nest and charged the native companion. It in turn, leapt at the opportunity to smash the eggs by dropping down from the sky. Only one remained intact. The outraged emu, finding nothing to throw at her antagonist, took this last egg and launched it after the brolga as it flew high into the sky. It hit its target, and, as it broke, formed the sun.

Alternative names and spellings
 Mudall
 Wongai-bun
 Wonghi
 Wonghibon
 Wonghibone
 Wonghibone
 Wongi-bone
 Wo'yaibun (typo)
 Wungai
 Wuzai/Wozai (z = substitute for the ng ( ŋ) symbol by Ridley)

Some words
 babena (father)
 boobi (baby)
 bulgari (boomerang)
 gunene (mother)
 meri (tame dog)
 walmera (medicine man)
 womboi (kangaroo)

Notes

Citations

Sources

Aboriginal peoples of New South Wales